Grim Reality is an extended play by American extreme metal band Macabre. Released in 1987, it is the band's first release.

Track listing
 "Serial Killer" –  1:51 - Henry Lee Lucas and Ottis Toole
 "Mr. Albert Fish (Was Children Your Favorite Dish?)" – 2:33 - Albert Fish
 "Disease"  – 1:37 *
 "Mass Murder" - 1:25
 "Sulfuric Acid"
 "Morbid Curiosity"
 "Lethal Injection"
 "Son of Sam" - David Berkowitz – 1:54
 "Hot Rods to Hell" – 1:50
 "Ed Gein" - Ed Gein – 2:55
 "Natural Disaster" – 1:25 *

*Not on all releases

Credits
 Corporate Death – guitars, vocals
 Nefarious – bass, vocals
 Dennis the Menace – drums

1987 debut EPs
Macabre (band) albums